The 2021 CAA men's soccer tournament was the postseason men's soccer tournament for the Colonial Athletic Association held from November 11 through November 14, 2021. The tournament was held at Hofstra Soccer Stadium in Hempstead, NY. The four-team single-elimination tournament consisted of two rounds based on seeding from regular season conference play. The defending champions were the James Madison Dukes. They were unable to defend their crown as they were under a post season ban from the CAA.  The Hofstra Pride won the tournament by defeating Elon 3–2 in the final. The conference tournament title was the fifth overall for the Hofstra men's soccer program all of which have come under head coach Richard Nuttall. As tournament champions, Hofstra earned the CAA's automatic berth into the 2021 NCAA Division I men's soccer tournament.

Seeding 
The top four teams in the regular season earned a spot in the tournament. Teams were seeded based on regular season conference record and tiebreakers were used to determine seedings of teams that finished with the same record.  James Madison Dukes finished third in the regular season standings but could not participate due to a postseason ban handed down by the CAA.  A tiebreaker was required to determine who would make the tournament as Drexel and UNC Wilmington finished tied on 13 points with 4–3–1 records.  Drexel defeated UNC Wilmington on September 11, 2–0 and earned the final tournament spot.

Bracket

Source:

Schedule

Semifinals

Final

Statistics

Goalscorers

All-Tournament team

Source:

MVP in bold

References 

CAA Men's Soccer Tournament
2021 Colonial Athletic Association men's soccer season